Hans Schmitz (December 12, 1896 – January 8, 1986) was a German politician of the Christian Democratic Union (CDU) and former member of the German Bundestag.

Life 
In 1949 Schmitz ran for the CDU in the constituency of Rheydt-Mönchengladbach-Viersen, was directly elected with 37.4% of the votes and thus belonged to the first German Bundestag.

Literature

References

1896 births
1986 deaths
Members of the Bundestag for North Rhine-Westphalia
Members of the Bundestag 1949–1953
Members of the Bundestag for the Christian Democratic Union of Germany